The Anuki language is an Austronesian language spoken by the Gabobora people along Cape Vogel in the Milne Bay Province of Papua New Guinea. The language was named after a highly respected deity of the people, whose sacred remains now rest in Australia.

Alphabet 
In Anuki alphabet are 26 letters and 8 diphthongs: Aa, Bb, Cc, Dd, Ee, Ff, Gg, Hh, Ii, Jj, Kk, Ll, Mm, Nn, Oo, Pp, Qq, Rr, Ss, Tt, Uu, Vv, Ww, Xx, Yy, Zz, Gh gh, aa, ch, ee, gw, ii, kw and sh.

Letters c, f, h, j, l, q, x and z are used only in loanwords and foreign names.

References

Landweer, M. Lynn. "Sociolinguistic Survey Report of the Anuki Language, Cape Vogel, Milne Bay Province, Papua New Guinea." 2001

External links 
 Alphabet and pronunciation

Definitely endangered languages
Nuclear Papuan Tip languages
Languages of Milne Bay Province